Waldemar Hvoslef (17 March 1825 – 5 May 1906) was a Norwegian Lutheran bishop.

Fredrik Waldemar Hvoslef was born in Christiania (now Oslo) and grew up in Holmestrand in Vestfold. He was the son of Jens Hvoslef (1783–1830) who served as Magistrate of Nordre Jarlsberg, now Vestfold. He began to study theology during 1850.

Hvoslef arrived in Kautokeino in Finnmark to serve as minister at the time of the Kautokeino Uprising in 1852. During that event two men, the local sheriff and the tradesman, were killed, while Hvoslef was attacked. The rebels were later seized by other Sami, who killed two of the rebels in the process. Hvoslef later served as pastor for the convicted Mons Somby and Aslak Hætta at their execution in 1854.

He was appointed Bishop of Tromsø stift in 1868. In 1881 he was appointed Bishop of the Diocese of Bjørgvin, and served in this position until his retirement in 1898.

He was married to Alette Katrine Frost (1826–1902) with whom he had nine children.

See also
The Kautokeino Rebellion
Laestadianism

References

1825 births
1906 deaths
Clergy from Oslo
People from Holmestrand
Bishops of Hålogaland
Bishops of Bjørgvin
People in Sámi history
Kautokeino rebellion